Symphonica in Rosso – Live at Ziggo Dome, Amsterdam is a live album by British soul-pop group Simply Red. The album was released on 23 November 2018.

Track listing

Charts

References

2018 live albums
Simply Red albums